Food Hunters is an American cooking competition television series that aired on Nickelodeon Latin America. It premiered on Sunday, October 16, 2016 in Latin America, and concluded on January 15, 2017. The project began filming in May. This program features 12 episodes of 60 minutes and is produced in collaboration with Chef Lorena Garcia and Cinemat Inc. for Nickelodeon Latin America.

Format 

Children between the ages of eight and thirteen can apply to become a contestant on the series. Four teams of two contestants each will compete in an outside obstacle race to collect the required ingredients. The first three teams to complete the outdoor challenge will use the ingredients collected and their culinary skills against their peers. They will compete against the clock and under the direction of Venezuelan chef Lorena Garcia, author and owner of several restaurants, who will evaluate and decide the winner of each episode.

The winner wins a medal and a scholarship to continue their culinary education.

List of episodes

Contestants

Episode 1

Episode 2

Episode 3

Episode 4

Episode 5

Episode 6

Episode 7

Episode 8

Episode 9

Episode 10

Episode 11

References

External links 

Spanish-language Nickelodeon original programming
2010s American cooking television series
Television series about children
Television series about teenagers